Kadihingala is a small town in Sri Lanka. It is located within Southern Province.

See also 
List of towns in Southern Province, Sri Lanka

External links 

Populated places in Southern Province, Sri Lanka